Events in the year 1937 in Brazil.

Incumbents

Federal government 
President: Getúlio Vargas

Governors 
 Alagoas: Osman Laurel
 Amazonas: Álvaro Botelho Maia 
 Bahia: Juracy Magalhães then Antônio Fernandes Dantas
 Ceará: Francisco de Meneses Pimentel
 Espírito Santo: João Punaro Bley
 Goiás: Pedro Ludovico Teixeira
 Maranhão:
 Mato Grosso: Mário Correia da Costa then Manuel Ari da Silva Pires then Júlio Strübing Müller
 Minas Gerais: Benedito Valadares Ribeiro
 Pará: José Carneiro da Gama Malcher
 Paraíba: Argemiro de Figueiredo 
 Paraná: Manuel Ribas
 Pernambuco: 
 till 10 November: Carlos de Lima Cavalcanti
 10 November-3 December: Amaro de Azambuja Vila Nova
 from 3 December: Agamenon Magalhães
 Piauí: Leônidas Melo 
 Rio Grande do Norte: Rafael Fernandes Gurjão 
 Rio Grande do Sul: José Antônio Flores da Cunha (till 17 October); Manuel de Cerqueira Daltro Filho (from 17 October)
 Santa Catarina: Nereu Ramos
 São Paulo: Henrique Smith Baima (till 5 January); José Joaquim Cardoso de Melo Neto (from 5 January)
 Sergipe: Erônides de Carvalho

Vice governors 
 Rio Grande do Norte: no vice governor
 São Paulo: no vice governor

Events
May 7 - One of the leaders of the communist revolution, Luis Carlos Prestes, is sentenced to 16 years and eight months in prison.
June 10 - National Democratic Union, ahead of support for the candidacy of Armando Sales de Oliveira for president in the 1938 elections is created.
June 14 - President Getúlio Vargas signed the decree establishing the Itatiaia National Park, the first national park in Brazil.
August 13 - The National Union of Students is founded in Rio de Janeiro.
November 10 - The fourth Brazilian Constitution is granted by President Vargas, starting the Estado Novo.
December 2 - President Vargas signs the ordinance which extinguishes all political parties in the country.

Arts and culture

Books
Cyro dos Anjos - O Amauense Belmiro

Births
 January 27 – João Antônio, journalist and short story writer (died 1996)
 June 4 – Hugo Carvana, actor (died 2014)
 June 11 – Reginaldo Faria, actor and film director
 June 17 – Clodovil Hernandes, fashion designer, television presenter and politician (died 2009)
 August 22 – Ary Toledo, Brazilian humorist, singer, lyricist and actor
 October 23 – Carlos Lamarca, military turned guerrilla leader (died 1971)

Deaths
 January 5 – Alberto de Oliveira, poet (born 1857)
 May 4 - Noel Rosa, singer and songwriter (born 1910)
 November 9 - Estácio Coimbra, lawyer and politician (born 1872)

See also 
1937 in Brazilian football

References

Bibliography
Helton Perillo Ferreira Leite. Planalto do Itatiaia. Publit, 2007. . .

See also 
1937 in Brazilian football
List of Brazilian films of 1937

 
1930s in Brazil
Years of the 20th century in Brazil
Brazil
Brazil